Harry's Café De Wheels is the second studio album by Australian singer Peter Blakeley. The album was released in November 1989 by Capitol Records.

At the ARIA Music Awards of 1991, the album was nominated for ARIA Award for Best Cover Art. Blakeley was nominated for ARIA Award for Best Male Artist.

Track listing

Charts

Weekly charts

Year-end charts

Certifications

References

1989 albums
Capitol Records albums